The 2012 United States House of Representatives elections in Virginia were held on Tuesday, November 6, 2012 to elect the 11 U.S. representatives from Virginia, one from each of the state's 11 congressional districts. Representatives are elected for two-year terms; those elected will serve in the 113th Congress from January 2013 until January 2015. The elections coincided with the elections of other federal and state offices, including a quadrennial presidential election, and a U.S. Senate election.

Overview

District 1

Republican Rob Wittman, who has represented the 1st District since December 2007, ran for re-election.

Republican primary

Candidates

Nominee
Rob Wittman, incumbent U.S. Representative

Democratic primary

Candidates

Nominee
Adam Cook, lawyer and Air Force reservist

Independent Greens primary
Gail Parker is the nominee of the Independent Greens of Virginia.

General election

Endorsements

Results

External links
Adam Cook
 Adam Cook campaign website
 
Rob Wittman
 Rob Wittman campaign website
Gail Parker
 Gail Parker campaign website

District 2

Republican Scott Rigell, who represented the 2nd District since January 2011, ran for re-election.

Republican primary

Candidates

Nominee
Scott Rigell, incumbent U.S. Representative

Democratic primary

Candidates

Nominee
Paul Hirschbiel, businessman

Declined
Glenn Nye, former U.S. Representative

General election

Endorsements

Polling

Predictions

Results

External links
Paul Hirschbiel
 Paul Hirschbiel campaign website
 <
Scott Rigell
 Scott Rigell campaign website

District 3

Democrat Bobby Scott, who has represented the 3rd District since 1993, ran for re-election.

Democratic primary

Candidates

Nominee
Bobby Scott, incumbent U.S. Representative

Republican primary

Candidates

Nominee
Dean Longo, businessman and retired Air Force lieutenant colonel

General election

Endorsements

Results

External links
 Dean Longo campaign website
 Bobby Scott campaign website

District 4

Republican Randy Forbes, who has represented the 4th District since 2001, ran for re-election.

Republican primary

Candidates

Nominee
Randy Forbes, incumbent U.S. Representative

Eliminated in primary
Bonnie Girard, businesswoman

Primary results

Democratic primary

Candidates

Nominee
Ella Ward, Chesapeake City Council member

Eliminated in primary
Joe Elliott, minister from Surry.

Primary results

General election

Endorsements

Results

External links
 Joe Elliott campaign website
 Randy Forbes campaign website
 Bonnie Girard campaign website
 Ella Ward campaign website

District 5

Republican Robert Hurt, who has represented the 5th District since January 2011, ran for re-election.

Republican primary

Candidates

Nominee
Robert Hurt, incumbent U.S. Representative

Democratic primary
John Douglass defeated Peyton Williams in a series of caucuses for the Democratic nomination.

Candidates

Nominee
John Douglass, retired United States Air Force brigadier general and former Assistant Secretary of the Navy

Eliminated in primary
Peyton Williams, defense systems engineer and retired Army Special Forces lieutenant colonel

Declined
Tom Perriello, former U.S. Representative

Independent Greens primary
Kenneth J. Hildebrandt was the nominee of the Independent Greens of Virginia.

General election

Endorsements

Predictions

Results

External links
 John Douglass campaign website
 Robert Hurt campaign website
 Kenneth J. Hildebrandt campaign website

District 6

Republican Bob Goodlatte, who has represented the 6th District since 1993, ran for re-election.

Republican primary

Candidates

Nominee
Bob Goodlatte, incumbent U.S. Representative

Eliminated in primary
Karen Kwiatkowski, farmer and retired Air Force lieutenant colonel

Primary results

Democratic primary

Candidates

Nominee
Andy Schmookler, author and radio talk show host

General election

Endorsements

Results

External links
 Bob Goodlatte campaign website
 Karen Kwiatkowski campaign website
 Andy Schmookler campaign website
Point/Counterpoint: Meet your congressional candidates: 6th district, Roanoke Times, September 23, 2012

District 7

Republican Eric Cantor, the U.S. House Majority Leader who has represented the 7th District since 2001, ran for re-election.

Republican primary

Candidates

Nominee
Eric Cantor, incumbent U.S. Representative

Eliminated in primary
Floyd Bayne, Independent Green candidate for this seat in 2010

Primary results

Democratic primary

Candidates

Nominee
Wayne Powell, lawyer and former Army officer

Withdrawn
David Hunsicker, real estate businessman and Vietnam War veteran

Independents
Vivek Jain, a medical doctor affiliated with the Occupy movement, ran as an Independent.

General election

Endorsements

Debates
Complete video of debate, October 1, 2012

Results

External links
Campaign contributions at OpenSecrets'
Floyd Bayne
 Floyd Bayne campaign website
 
Eric Cantor
 Eric Cantor campaign website
Vivek Jain
 Vivek Jain campaign website
Wayne Powell
 Wayne Powell campaign website

District 8

Democrat Jim Moran, who has represented the 8th District since 1991, ran for re-election.

Democratic primary
A controversy erupted when the Democratic Party of Virginia disqualified Moran's primary challenger Shuttleworth, saying he had fallen 17 signatures short of the 1,000 threshold required. Shuttleworth filed a federal lawsuit; the party then changed course without explanation and allowed Shuttleworth on the ballot. 

Moran won the primary against Shuttleworth by a sizable margin.

Candidates

Nominee
Jim Moran, incumbent U.S. Representative

Eliminated in primary
Bruce Shuttleworth, business consultant and former Navy pilot

Withdrawn
Will Radle, a financial advisor

Primary results

Republican primary

Candidates

Nominee
Jay Patrick Murray, retired army colonel nominee for this seat in 2010

Independent Greens primary
Janet Murphy was the nominee of the Independent Greens of Virginia.

Independents
Jason Howell, accountant and author, ran as an Independent.

General election

Endorsements

Results

External links
 Jim Moran campaign website
 Patrick Murray campaign website
 Bruce Shuttleworth campaign website
 Jason Howell campaign website

District 9

Republican Morgan Griffith, who has represented the 9th District since January 2011, ran for re-election.

Republican primary

Candidates

Nominee
Morgan Griffith, incumbent U.S. Representative

Democratic primary

Candidates

Nominee
Anthony Flaccavento, farmer and sustainability consultant

Withdrawn
Jeremiah Heaton, Independent candidate for this seat in 2010
Jim Werth, psychology professor at Radford University,

General election

Endorsements

Results

External links
Anthony Flaccavento
 
Morgan Griffith
 Morgan Griffith campaign website

District 10

Republican Frank Wolf, who has represented the 10th District since 1981, ran for re-election.

Republican primary

Candidates

Nominee
Frank Wolf, incumbent U.S. Representative

Democratic primary

Candidates

Nominee
Kristin Cabral, attorney

Withdrawn
John Douglass, retired United States Air Force brigadier general and former Assistant Secretary of the Navy (running in the 5th district)

Declined
Jeff Barnett, retired Air Force colonel and nominee for this seat in 2010.

Independents
Kevin Chisholm, an independent and practicing engineer, also qualified for the ballot as an independent candidate.

General election

Endorsements

Results

External links
Kristin Cabral
 Kristin Cabral campaign website
 
Frank Wolf
 Frank Wolf campaign website
Kevin Chisholm
 Kevin Chisholm campaign website

District 11

Democrat Gerry Connolly, who has represented the 11th District since 2009, ran for re-election. Connolly won the 2010 election by just 981 votes (0.4%).

Democratic primary

Candidates

Nominee
Gerry Connolly, incumbent U.S. Representative

Republican primary

Candidates

Nominee
Christopher Perkins, retired army colonel

Eliminated in primary
Ken Vaughn, traffic engineer

Declined
Keith Fimian, property inspection company founder and nominee for this seat in 2008 & 2010

Primary results

General election

Endorsements

Results

External links
 Gerry Connolly campaign website
 Christopher Perkins campaign website
 Joe Galdo campaign website
 Ken Vaughn campaign website

References

External links
Virginia State Board of Elections
Official candidate list
United States House of Representatives elections in Virginia, 2012 at Ballotpedia
Virginia from OurCampaigns.com
Virginia Congressional Races in 2012 from Open Secrets (campaign contributions)
Outside spending at the Sunlight Foundation

Virginia

2012
2012 Virginia elections